Petr Nymburský (born 1 June 1995) is a Czech sports shooter.

References

External links

1995 births
Living people
Czech male sport shooters
Olympic shooters of the Czech Republic
Shooters at the 2020 Summer Olympics
People from Tábor
Sportspeople from the South Bohemian Region